Cooper School is a historic one-room school building for African-American students located near Mebane, Alamance County, North Carolina. It was built about 1900, and is a one-story, three-bay, frame building.  It has a tin gable-front roof and is sheathed in plain weatherboard. The school continued to operate until 1907 when a larger educational facility, the Oaks School, was built nearby.

It was added to the National Register of Historic Places in 1986.

References

One-room schoolhouses in North Carolina
African-American history of North Carolina
School buildings on the National Register of Historic Places in North Carolina
School buildings completed in 1900
Schools in Alamance County, North Carolina
National Register of Historic Places in Alamance County, North Carolina
1900 establishments in North Carolina